Tem, or Kotokoli (Cotocoli), is a Gur language spoken in Togo, Ghana, Benin and Burkina Faso. It is used by neighboring peoples.
In Ghana the Kotokoli people comes from a northern part of the Volta Region a town called Koue. Koue shares boarder with Togo with a small river which is called the Koue river separating it from Togo.

Writing System

High tone is indicated by an acute accent: á é ɛ́ í ɩ́ ó ɔ́ ú ʊ́, no accent indicates low tone.
Long vowels are indicated by doubling the letter: aa ee ɛɛ ii ɩɩ oo ɔɔ uu ʊʊ, both are accented if the tone is high: (áá etc.), only the first is accented if the tone is descending (áa), only the second is accented if the tone is ascending (aá).

References

Languages of Benin
Languages of Togo
Languages of Ghana
Gurunsi languages